Clutton railway station served the village of Clutton, Somerset, England from 1873 to 1959 on the Bristol and North Somerset Railway.

History 
The station opened on 3 September 1873 by the Great Western Railway. The station closed to passengers on 2 November 1959 and to goods traffic on 15 June 1964.

References

External links 

Disused railway stations in Somerset
Railway stations in Great Britain opened in 1873
Railway stations in Great Britain closed in 1959
1873 establishments in England
1964 disestablishments in England